The Wildman River is a river in the Darwin Coastal bioregion of the Northern Territory, Australia.

Location and features
Formed by the confluence of the East and West Branches of the Wildman River, the river rises southwest of Kapalga in the Kakadu National Park, west of the Alligator Rivers watershed. The Wildman River flows generally northeast and then east, joined by its only major tributary, the Alligator Creek. At this point, the river's eastern bank define a  stretch of the western boundary of the Kakadu National Park. The Wildman River reaches its mouth, emptying into Finke Bay in the Van Diemen Gulf of the Timor Sea. The river descends  over its  course.

The estuary formed at the river mouth is in near pristine condition.

Etymology
The river was named by John Davis, the Government store keeper in 1866, after E. T. Wildman, the Secretary to the South Australian Crown Lands Commission, who was a friend of Davis.

See also

List of rivers of Northern Territory

References

External links
Google Earth
Kakadu National Park

Arnhem Land
Rivers of the Northern Territory